Pedro Espinosa Lorenzo (1934–2007) was a Spanish pianist and pedagogue.

1934 births
2007 deaths
Spanish pianists
20th-century pianists
20th-century Spanish musicians